Wollae Station is a railway station of the Donghae Line in Jangan-eup, Gijang County, Busan, South Korea.

External links

Gijang County
Korail stations
Railway stations in Busan
Railway stations opened in 1935